Open Mouth Kiss is the fourth album by New York band, Leeway. It was released in 1995 on Bulletproof Records and follows Adult Crash from 1994. It is the band's final album to date.

The track, "I Believe", is a cover version of the song by English punk rock band, Buzzcocks.

Track listing
 All songs written by A.J. Novello, Eddie Sutton, and Jimmy Xanthos, unless stated otherwise
"Foot the Bill" – 3:21  
"Hornet's Nest" – 3:43  
"Product" – 3:09  
"Jock Hop Show" – 3:42  
"Compromise" – 2:52  
"Manufabricate" – 3:03  
"State" – 4:26  
"The Old Man of Sorrows" – 3:00  
"I Believe" (Buzzcocks) – 3:20  
"Comes Back to Haunt" – 2:20  
"Novena" – 3:18

Credits
 Eddie Sutton – vocals
 A.J. Novello – guitar
 Jimmy Xanthos – bass
 Pokey – drums
 Recorded by Tom Soares at Normandy Sound. Additional recording at Spa Studios,  mixed at Riversound, New York City, U.S.

External links
Encyclopaedia Metallum album entry
Leeway official website
BNR Metal discography page

1995 albums
Leeway (band) albums